3 is the third studio album by Japanese math rock band Tricot. It was released on May 17, 2017 in Japan by the band's own label Bakuretsu Records. The album was released on the same day by Big Scary Monsters Recording Company in the United Kingdom and by Topshelf Records in the United States.

Critical reception

Patrick St. Michel of The Japan Times wrote that 3 showcases Tricot's "ability to strike a balance between complex instrumentation and sudden emotional flourishes." Phil Witmerwrote of Vice opined that "what makes 3 and the rest of Tricot's music transcend the 'experimental' label is a transparent, pop-derived emotional core", while noting 3 to be the band's "heaviest, most challenging album". Chris DeVille of Stereogum described the album's music as "intricate and noodly" but played with "a frantic energy and melodic directness worthy of the Bangles."

AllMusic critic John D. Buchanan found that Tricot, while not innovative, are nonetheless "very good, and in a crowded marketplace they do manage to bring something unique to the table", citing their ability to "infuse their challenging avant-rock with a real pop sensibility".

Track listing
All tracks written by Tricot (Motoko Kida, Ikkyu Nakajima and Hiromi Sagane).

 "Tokyo Vampire Hotel" – 2:31
 "Wabi-Sabi" – 3:06
 "Yosoiki" (よそいき) – 3:56
 "DeDeDe" – 3:28
 "Sukima" (スキマ) – 5:16
 "Pork Side" – 1:01
 "Pork Ginger" (ポークジンジャー) – 4:44
 "Echo" (エコー) – 3:47
 "18, 19" – 4:01
 "Namu" (南無) – 2:46
 "Munasawagi" – 4:12
 "Setsuyakuka" (節約家) – 4:28
 "Melon Soda" (メロンソーダ) – 2:44

Personnel
Credits are adapted from the album's liner notes.

Tricot
 Motoko "Motifour" Kida – guitar, backing vocals
 Ikkyu Nakajima – vocals, guitar
 Hiromi "Hirohiro" Sagane – bass, backing vocals

Additional musicians
 Yuma Abe – drums (track 12)
 Kosuke Wakiyama – drums (track 7)
 Yusuke Yoshida – drums (tracks 1–6, 8–11, 13)

Production
 Masayuki Nakano – recording, mixing
 Akihiro Shiba – mastering

Design
 Hikaru Cho – cover artwork

Charts

References

External links
 
 

2017 albums
Tricot (band) albums
Big Scary Monsters Recording Company albums
Topshelf Records albums